Alejandra Paola Pérez López (born 9 July 1998) is a Venezuelan Paralympic athlete who competes in sprinting events at international elite events.

Perez competed at the 2020 Summer Paralympics, winning the bronze medal at the women's 400m event. She is the twin sister of Linda Patricia Pérez López who is also an athlete.

References

1998 births
Living people
Sportspeople from Maracaibo
Paralympic athletes of Venezuela
Venezuelan female sprinters
Athletes (track and field) at the 2020 Summer Paralympics
Medalists at the 2020 Summer Paralympics
Paralympic bronze medalists for Venezuela
Paralympic medalists in athletics (track and field)
Twin sportspeople
Venezuelan twins
21st-century Venezuelan women